County of Temes (Hungarian: Temes, Romanian: Timiș, Serbian: Тамиш or Tamiš, German: Temes or Temesch) was an administrative county (comitatus) of the Kingdom of Hungary. Its territory is now in southwestern Romania and northeastern Serbia. The capital of the county was Temesvár (Romanian: Timișoara, Serbian: Темишвар or Temišvar, German: Temeswar or Temeschwar), which also served as the kingdom's capital between 1315–1323.

Geography
[[Image:Temes_county_map.jpg|thumb|left|alt=Map of Temes county in the Kingdom of Hungary|Map of Temes, 1891.]]
Temes county was located in the Banat region. It shared borders with the Kingdom of Serbia and the Hungarian counties of Torontál, Arad and Krassó-Szörény. The river Danube formed its southern border, and the river Mureș its northern border. The rivers Bega, Timiș, Bârzava and Caraș flowed through the county.

History

Temes County was formed in the 12th century, after the establishment of Hungarian rule in the region. It was named after the local Temes (Timiș) river. The principal center of the county was named Temesvár'' in the Hungarian language, meaning literally: Temes Castle. The territory was an important place in the power struggle between Samuel Aba and Peter Orseolo. In 1070, the Pechenegs, allying with the Byzantines, who tried to annex the territory, devastated it, before they were routed by Géza I. Michael Doukas VII sent a golden diadem, today part of the Holy Crown, recognizing Hungary's territorial sovereignty. In the late 11th century, Cuman and Byzantine raids restarted, but were repelled by Ladislaus I, the "knight-king". By the reign of Béla III, a substantial part of the territory was inhabited by Turks and Slavs due to constant raids and the decrease of the Hungarian population. The first mention of the county was in 1212. The area was taken by the Ottoman Empire in the 16th century (following the 1552 Siege of Temesvár) and the county was abolished. Its territory was then included into the Ottoman Temeşvar Eyalet.

After the region was captured by the Habsburgs in 1716, the area was included into the so-called Banat of Temeswar, a Habsburg province with the administrative center in Temeswar. This province was abolished in 1778 and the county of Temes was restored (with significantly different borders than in medieval times) and incorporated into Habsburg Kingdom of Hungary in 1779.

Between 1849 and 1860, the area of the county was part of the Voivodeship of Serbia and Temes Banat, a separate Austrian crownland. After 1853, the county did not exist since the voivodeship was divided into districts. After the voivodeship was abolished in 1860, the area was again incorporated into the Habsburg Kingdom of Hungary and the county was recreated in January 1861. In 1876, when the administrative structure of the Kingdom of Hungary was changed, the borders of Temes County were modified to include parts of the territory of the former Banat Military Frontier (including Fehértemplom/Bela Crkva, formerly the seat of the so-called Illyrian Regiment).

In 1918, the county first became part of the newly proclaimed Banat Republic that lasted for only a few days. The region was taken by Serbian and French troops, and then divided in 1919 between the Kingdom of Romania and the newly formed Kingdom of Serbs, Croats and Slovenes, as both of the powers claimed the entire territory of the Banat. The border arrangements were set by the Paris Peace Conference. A majority of the county was assigned to Romania, while the south-western third was assigned to the Kingdom of Serbs, Croats and Slovenes (renamed to Yugoslavia in 1929).

The Yugoslav part of the pre-1920 Temes County (the southern region) is part of the Serbian autonomous region of Vojvodina. The Romanian part is now part of Timiș County, except for a ~ wide strip along the Mureș River, which is in Arad County.

Demographics

Subdivisions

In the early 20th century, the subdivisions of Temes county were:

The towns of Vršac, Bela Crkva, and Kovin are now in Serbia; the other towns mentioned are now in Romania.

Notes

References

States and territories established in 1779
States and territories established in 1860
States and territories disestablished in 1552
States and territories disestablished in 1849
States and territories disestablished in 1920
Counties in the Kingdom of Hungary
Medieval history of Vojvodina
Vojvodina under Habsburg rule
History of Banat